The Amsterdam Diamond is a black diamond weighing , and has 145 facets. It is in a pear shape, and cut from a  rough. It was sold in 2001 for $US352,000, the highest price paid for a black diamond at auction.

The diamond originated in Africa.

See also
 List of diamonds

External links
The Amsterdam Diamond on The World of Famous Diamonds

Individual diamonds
Black diamonds